Mark Radcliffe may refer to:

 Mark Radcliffe (radio broadcaster) (born 1958), English radio broadcaster, musician and writer
 Mark Radcliffe (politician) (born 1971), American Democratic politician and lawyer